On the Correct Handling of Contradictions Among the People is a 1957 essay by the Chinese Communist revolutionary Mao Zedong published during the Eleventh Session of the Supreme State Conference. It explores the concepts developed by Mao in the 1937 publication On Contradiction concerning the metaphysics of dialectical reasoning, and sets out to establish a social philosophy based on these concepts. 

The essay originated in a speech to the Communist Party in February 1957. It was revised and printed in the Peoples Daily later (June?) in 1957. The main point of the speech was to make a distinction between "contradictions amongst the people" and "counter-revolutionary contradictions". The former were to be treated quite differently from the latter.  The stated Maoist policy was to "isolate the few and win over the many".  The understanding being that "the many" were basically supportive of the Chinese Communist Party, whereas "the few" were determined to overthrow the Party and create Chaos at the behest of foreign or class enemies. 

The February 1957 speech is associated with the Hundred Flowers period, when it seemed that a degree of liberalisation was in the wings. However, this was rapidly followed (from July 1957) by the Anti-Rightist Campaign, which lasted until about 1959.  Some analysts believe that the "Hundred Flowers" process was a plan to expose those who favoured liberalisation and others are of the view that there was a change of thinking in the CCP leadership.

The speech and essay are largely forgotten today, but notably, very early on in 1989, the CCP leadership began to refer to the protesters (students and otherwise) as "counter-revolutionaries".  In 1989 there was little or no attempt by the CCP to "win over the many", in spite of the fact that, (particularly in Chengdu) many of the protesters demands related to corruption, nepotism and misgovernment rather than overthrow of the CCP.

References

Ideology of the Chinese Communist Party
Works by Mao Zedong